Jeevikkan Marannupoya Sthree is a 1974 Indian Malayalam film, directed by K. S. Sethumadhavan and produced by K. S. R. Moorthy. The film stars Sheela, Vijayasree, Mohan Sharma and Sankaradi in the lead roles. The film had musical score by M. S. Viswanathan.

Cast
Sheela as Bhama
Vijayasree as Kanakam
KPAC Lalitha as Malini
Mohan Sharma as Chandran 
Sankaradi as Panikker
Baby Sumathi as Nalini
Bahadoor as Rajan
Kanchana
M. G. Soman as Balan
TR Omana as Bhama's Mother

Soundtrack
The music was composed by M. S. Viswanathan and the lyrics were written by Vayalar Ramavarma.

References

External links
 

1974 films
1970s Malayalam-language films
Films scored by M. S. Viswanathan
Films directed by K. S. Sethumadhavan